Falmouth High School may refer to:

Falmouth High School (Massachusetts), Falmouth, Massachusetts
Falmouth High School (Maine), Falmouth, Maine

See also
Falmouth School